Persicaria senegalensis is a species of perennial herb in the family Polygonaceae. They have a self-supporting growth form and simple, broad leaves.

Sources

References 

senegalensis
Flora of Malta